The following lists the top 25 (end of year) charting singles on the Australian Singles Charts, for the year of 1976. These were the best charting singles in Australia for 1976. The source for this year is the "Kent Music Report".

These charts are calculated by David Kent of the Kent Music Report and they are based on the number of weeks and position the records reach within the top 100 singles for each week.

References

Australian record charts
Top
Australia Top 25 Singles